Stoyko Sakaliev (born 25 March 1979) is a Bulgarian footballer.

Career
Sakaliev was born in Sofia. His first team was Naftex Burgas. He was first loaned to CSKA Sofia during 2004, but bought in the summer of 2005. He scored a goal against Steaua on 30 September 2004 in a UEFA Cup match. In 2007, for a period of six months, Stoyko was loaned out to Lokomotiv Plovdiv. In August 2008, he went to play for Spartak Varna. On 5 March 2011, Sakaliev scored a last-minute goal against Vidima Rakovski in an A PFG match. In the summer of 2011 Sakaliev signed contract with Eastern B group side Neftochimic 1962. On 17 September 2011 he scored twice from penalties as Neftochimic finished 2:2 with Botev Plovdiv. Sakaliev has just signed a contract with Kercem Ajax, playing in the first division on the island of Gozo, Malta. In late May 2013, Sakaliev announced his retirement from football.

International career
In 2004 Stoyko Sakaliev played in four matches for Bulgaria national football team.

Television
In 2013, he participated in VIP Brother Bulgaria.

Personal

He was known for his elaborate pranks on teammates and other public figures during his playing days.

References

External links
 
 

Bulgarian footballers
Bulgaria international footballers
Living people
1979 births
First Professional Football League (Bulgaria) players
Neftochimic Burgas players
PFC CSKA Sofia players
PFC Lokomotiv Plovdiv players
PFC Spartak Varna players
Akademik Sofia players
Big Brother (Bulgarian TV series) contestants
Expatriate footballers in Poland
Association football forwards
Bulgarian expatriates in Malta